Langton Long Blandford is a small village and civil parish in the county of Dorset in southern England. In 2013 the estimated population of the parish was 120.

Forming the southeastern line of the parish boundary is an old track linking prehistoric Buzbury Rings, on nearby Keyneston Hill, to a ford over the river.

St Leonards farmhouse used to house a leper hospital.

The parish church was rebuilt in 1862.

References

Villages in Dorset